The Oran Expedition in 1707 was a military operation led by Moulay Ismail ibn Sharif in which he attempted to extend Moroccan rule into western Algeria. The battle ended in a Moroccan defeat, and the site of the battle was named after the defeated Moroccan king, Moulay Ismail.

Background 
Oran which was then under Spanish rule was plagued by the attempts of Morocco and Algiers. Despite his previous unsuccessful siege in 1693, Moulay Ismail made another attempt to extend Moroccan domination to Oran in 1707. The Moroccan king raided the areas near Oran, with the objective of eventually taking control of the city.

Battle 
The attack took place in a forest not far from a small village called La Mare d'Eau. 35 km east of Oran.

Moulay Ismail and his army encountered the Bey of Mascara Mustapha Bouchelaghem who then severely defeated Moulay Ismail. Moulay Ismail's army was almost entirely destroyed.

Consequences 
It is said that the night of his defeat, while fleeing the battle, followed only by a few of his officers Ismail turned to them and said :«Oran is comparable to a viper sheltered under rock, misery to the unwise who touch it !».

Right after the unsuccessful Moroccan invasion Mustapha Bouchelaghem captured Oran from the Spaniards. This defeat sealed the Algerian supremecy between Tlemcen, Mostaghanem, Mascara and Oran's region corresponding to the Beylik of the West and the main territories of the Kingdom of Tlemcen it is the last attempt of attacks and invasion by Morocco in western Algeria establishing borders with Moulouya river until the 19th century.

References

Battles involving Algeria
Battles involving Morocco
1707 in military history
Oran
Wars involving Algeria
Wars involving Morocco
18th century in Algeria
18th century in Morocco